Mimi Karlsen (born 23 January 1957 in Maniitsoq, Greenland, Kingdom of Denmark) is a Greenlandic politician. A member of the Inuit Ataqatigiit she is currently Minister for Culture, Education, Research and Church Affairs.

References

1957 births
Living people
Inuit Ataqatigiit politicians
Government ministers of Greenland
People from Maniitsoq
Greenlandic Inuit people
Greenlandic socialists
21st-century Greenlandic politicians
21st-century Danish women politicians
Women government ministers of Greenland